Stathmopoda endotherma is a species of moth in the family Stathmopodidae.  It is endemic to New Zealand. It is classified as "At Risk, Naturally Uncommon" by the Department of Conservation.

Taxonomy 
This species was described by Edward Meyrick in 1931 using a specimen collected at Little River, Banks Peninsula in January by Stewart Lindsay. George Hudson discussed and illustrated the species in his 1939 book A supplement to the butterflies and moths of New Zealand. The holotype specimen is held at the Canterbury Museum.

Description 
Meyrick described the species as follows:

Distribution 
This species is endemic to New Zealand. As well as the type locality, this species has also been collected at Akaroa, Riccarton Bush, Prices Valley at Banks Peninsula,  Klondyke Corner at Arthurs Pass National Park, McQuilkans Creek at Swampy Summit near Dunedin, and Dunsdale Scenic Reserve in Southland.

Biology and life cycle 
This species is on the wing between late October and January.

Host species and habitat 
As this moth belongs to the genus Stathmopoda its larvae, like those of other species in the genus, may feed on scale insects. The preferred habitat of this species is indigenous forest.

Conservation Status 
This species has been classified as having the "At Risk, Naturally Uncommon" conservation status under the New Zealand Threat Classification System.

References

External links

Image of holotype specimen p. 24

Moths described in 1931
Stathmopodidae
Moths of New Zealand
Endemic fauna of New Zealand
Endangered biota of New Zealand
Endemic moths of New Zealand